Tenthredo livida is a sawfly species belonging to the family Tenthredinidae (common sawflies), subfamily Tenthredininae.

Distribution and habitat
This species is present in most of Europe.
These sawflies mainly inhabit woodland rides, hedge rows and spruce forest edge.

Description
The thorax and head are black, with a large white mouth area and white tips on antennae. Forewings have a white and brown stigma. This species is rather variable in colour. The abdomen is usually black in females, orange-reddish in males.

Biology
Adults can be encountered from May through August feeding on small insects and on nectar and pollen of flowers, especially of Apiaceae species (Anthriscus sylvestris, Heracleum sphondylium).

Gallery

References

 Magis N. (2003): Notes faunistiques sur les espèces du genre Tenthredo Linné, 1758 sensu lato dans la région Franco-rhénane (Hymenoptera Symphyta : Tenthredinidae, Tenthredininae), Notes fauniques de Gembloux, n° 53 [as Tenthredella livida (Linné, 1758)]

Sawflies described in 1758
Taxa named by Carl Linnaeus
Tenthredinidae
Hymenoptera of Europe